The Rum Mehmed Pasha Mosque is an old Ottoman mosque located in a large and densely populated district of Üsküdar, in Istanbul, Turkey.

Rum Mehmed Pasha Mosque is located close to the Bosphorus waterfront and Şemsi Pasha, Yeni Valide and Mihrimah Sultan historical mosques located in the Üsküdar district. It is the first mosque to be built on the Asian (Anatolian) side of Istanbul following its takeover and collapse of the Eastern Roman Empire.

History 
The mosque was built in 1471 for the Grand Vizier Rum Mehmed Pasha, who was of Greek origin. The mosque combines architectural elements of Ottoman and Byzantine styles, built of stone and brick. It was restored in 1953.

Gallery

See also
 Islamic architecture
 List of mosques
 Ottoman architecture

References 

 Rum Mehmed Pasha Mosque at ArchNet.org

External links

 Images of Rum Mehmed Pasha Mosque

Religious buildings and structures completed in 1471
15th-century mosques
Ottoman mosques in Istanbul
Mosque buildings with domes
Üsküdar